The enzyme galactonate dehydratase catalyzes the chemical reaction

D-galactonate  2-dehydro-3-deoxy-D-galactonate + H2O

This enzyme belongs to the family of lyases, specifically the hydro-lyases, which cleave carbon-oxygen bonds.  The systematic name of this enzyme class is D-galactonate hydro-lyase (2-dehydro-3-deoxy-D-alactonate-forming). Other names in common use include D-galactonate dehydrase, D-galactonate dehydratase, and D-galactonate hydro-lyase.  This enzyme participates in galactose metabolism.

References

 

EC 4.2.1
Enzymes of unknown structure